Pareuchontha is a genus of moths of the family Notodontidae. It consists of the following species:
Pareuchontha albimargo Miller, 1989
Pareuchontha albipes  (Maassen, 1890) 
Pareuchontha fuscivena Miller, 2008
Pareuchontha grandimacula  (Dognin, 1902) 
Pareuchontha olibra Miller, 2008

Notodontidae of South America